Thomas Slythurst (died 1560) was an English academic and Roman Catholic priest. He was  the first President of Trinity College, Oxford. He lost his positions in 1559, on the accession of Elizabeth I of England, by his refusal to take the Oath of Supremacy. It has been said that he died in the Tower of London, but this is contested.

Life

Slythurst was born in Berkshire. He was B.A. Oxon, 1530; M.A., 1534; B.D., 1543; and supplicated for the degree of D.D., 1554-5, but never took it. He was rector of Chalfont St. Peter, Buckinghamshire, from 1545 to 1555, canon of Windsor 1554, rector of Chalfont St. Giles, Bucks, 1555. He was deprived of these three preferments in 1559. 
  	
On 11 November 1556, he was appointed with others by Convocation to regulate the exercises in theology on the election of Cardinal Pole to the chancellorship.

Notes

References

Attribution

1560 deaths
16th-century scholars
Canons of Windsor
Presidents of Trinity College, Oxford
Year of birth unknown
16th-century English Roman Catholic priests